Walter Cruice (April 13, 1913 – December 7, 2001) was a professional American football player, assistant coach, and scout in the National Football League with the Green Bay Packers. He served as Chief Scout for 31 years under every head coach from Curly Lambeau through Bart Starr. During his time with the team, the Packers won five league championships, including the first two Super Bowls.

Playing career
Cruice played high school football at Washington High School in Milwaukee, Wisconsin. His high school coach was future Packers' coach Lisle Blackbourn, for whom he would later serve under as Chief Scout from 1954–1957. He then played college football as a halfback at Northwestern University from 1934–1936 and was the team's co-captain and most valuable player as a senior.  After his final season, he played in the East–West Shrine Game.

Cruice was drafted by the Packers as the 70th pick in the 1936 NFL Draft, but turned down the contract offer. Instead, he went to work for an oil company in Chicago and played for the Chicago Gunners, a regional professional team.

Coaching career
Cruice began his coaching career by coaching freshman football at Northwestern in 1938 and 1939 and served as an assistant coach at Naval Station Great Lakes in 1942 and 1943.  He was hired by the Packers in 1946 and worked for them through 1949. When Curly Lambeau resigned as the Packers' coach and took over the Chicago Cardinals, Cruice left with him for two seasons.  Cruice returned to the Packers in 1952 under Gene Ronzani and scouted for them through the 1976 season, Bart Starr's second as head coach. Cruice also served under Scooter McLean, Vince Lombardi, Phil Bengtson and Dan Devine.

1913 births
2001 deaths
Sportspeople from Milwaukee
American football halfbacks
Green Bay Packers coaches
Chicago Cardinals coaches
Great Lakes Navy Bluejackets football coaches
Northwestern Wildcats football players
Players of American football from Milwaukee